Husson is a French surname. Notable people by that name include:

 Honoré Jean Aristide Husson (1803-1864), French academic sculptor.
 Thérèse-Adèle Husson (born 1803), French writer in the post-Revolutionary period.
 Marcel Husson (born 1937), retired French football player.
 Édouard Husson (born 1969), is a French historian and former CEO of ESCP Europe. 
 Guy Husson (born 1931), retired French track and field athlete.
 Charles Claude Husson (1847–1915), French Archetier/bow maker.
 Albert Husson (1912–1978), French playwright and theatre director. 
 Jules Fleury-Husson, French art critic who wrote under the name Champfleury.
 Michelle Jenner Husson (born 1986), Spanish cinema and television actress.

French-language surnames